Stagione (Italian for "season") is an organizational system for presenting opera, often used by large houses. Typically each production is cast separately and has a brief but intensive run of performances. By contrast, companies that use a repertory system maintain a permanent company and rotate productions over many months or even years. Historically the stagione system has been preferred in Britain, the United States, and most large international operahouses.

Sources
The Oxford Dictionary of Opera, by John Warrack and Ewan West (1992),  782 pages,  
The New Grove Dictionary of Opera, ed. Stanley Sadie (London, 1992) 

Italian opera terminology